Rosario Hernández Diéguez (nickname,  A Calesa; Vigo, February 17, 1916 – Vigo, September 3, 1936) was a Spanish Galician newspaper hawker and trade unionist, affiliated with Unión General de Trabajadores (UGT) and Spanish Socialist Workers' Party (PSOE). Raped, mutilated, tortured, she died young, a victim of Franco's repression. A street in her hometown bears her name.

Biography
Rosario Hernández Diéguez was the daughter of an anarchist railwayman. Her home was on Calle Pino in Vigo. Everyone knew her by her nickname, "A Calesa".

She worked as a newspaper hawker in the doorway of the society "El Gimnasio" on Calle del Príncipe, reading out the news in the newspapers. She visited the UGT's Casa del pueblo of the UGT, and attended PSOE meetings. In sympathy with the latter, she actively participated in the worker demonstrations of the time.

Hernandez fled with the uprising of July 18, 1936. Captured and arrested on September 3, 1936. Imprisoned in the city's María Berdiales Fronton, she received meals brought in by her sister, Maria. Insolent, rather than submissive, devoted and obedient, she was shaved, raped, mutilated, and murdered in a Falange barracks. Her body was anchored to an iron grill before it was thrown off a boat in the Ria de Vigo, near the Cíes Islands.

Legacy

A street in Vigo's Coutadas area, between the Os Rosais institute and Travesía de Vigo bears the name Rosario Hernández Diéguez.

See also
 Women in the Spanish Socialist Workers' Party in the Spanish Civil War

Notes

References

Sources
 
 

1916 births
1936 deaths
People from Vigo
Spanish trade unionists
Women in the Spanish Civil War
People killed in the Spanish Civil War
Victims of the White Terror (Spain)
Spanish activists